Gavan (also Romanized as Gāvān; also known as Kāvān and Kavān) is a village in Khvoresh Rostam-e Shomali Rural District, Khvoresh Rostam District, Khalkhal County, Ardabil Province, Iran. At the 2006 census, its population was 49, in 13 families.

References 

Towns and villages in Khalkhal County